Trun is a rural locality (a settlement) in Chernushinsky District, Perm Krai, Russia. The population was 28 as of 2010. There are 3 streets.

References 

Rural localities in Chernushinsky District